Eugenia Georges is an American anthropologist and Professor of Anthropology at Rice University. She is known for her works on the cultural study of reproduction, medical anthropology, economic development, and labor migration.

Education and career 
She received her PhD in anthropology from Columbia University in 1985. She is the Chair of Department of Anthropology at Rice University.

Books
 Bodies of Knowledge: the Medicalization of Reproduction in Greece, Vanderbilt University Press 2008
 The Making of a Transnational Community: Migration, Development and Cultural Change in the Dominican Republic, Columbia University Press 1990

References

External links 

American women anthropologists
Living people
Rice University faculty
Columbia Graduate School of Arts and Sciences alumni
Tulane University alumni
Eckerd College alumni
Cultural anthropologists
Year of birth missing (living people)